Rebutia pulvinosa is a species of cactus in the genus Rebutia, native to Bolivia. Two of its subspecies, Rebutia pulvinosa subsp.albiflora and Rebutia pulvinosa subsp.perplexa, have gained the Royal Horticultural Society's Award of Garden Merit.

Subspecies

The following subspecies are currently accepted:
Rebutia pulvinosa subsp. albiflora (F.Ritter & Buining) Hjertson
Rebutia pulvinosa subsp. perplexa (Donald) Hjertson

References

pulvinosa
Endemic flora of Bolivia
Plants described in 1963